Freckelton is the surname of the following people:
Grant Freckelton, American visual effects artist, art director and production designer 
Ian Freckelton, Australian lawyer

See also
Freckleton, a village and civil parish in Lancashire, England

English-language surnames